Northam was an electoral district of the Legislative Assembly in the Australian state of Western Australia from 1890 to 1974.

The district was based on the town of Northam lying to the east of Perth. It was one of the original 30 seats contested at the 1890 election. The district was abolished at the 1974 election. Its last member, Ken McIver of the Labor Party, went on to become the member for Avon.

Northam was represented by five members over the course of its 84-year history. Three of those members served as Premier of Western Australia: George Throssell (Premier 1901), James Mitchell (Premier 1919–1924 & 1930–1933) and Albert Hawke (Premier 1953–1959).

Members

Election results

Northam